In probability theory and statistics, the poly-Weibull distribution is a continuous probability distribution.  The distribution is defined to be that of a random variable defined to be the smallest of a number of statistically independent random variables having non-identical Weibull distributions.

References 

 Preprint

Continuous distributions
Survival analysis